Bow Down to the Exit Sign is a studio album by David Holmes, released in 2000. It features contributions from Bobby Gillespie, Sean Gullette, Jon Spencer, Martina Topley-Bird and Carl Hancock Rux. The song "69 Police" features during the closing scene of the 2001 remake of Ocean's Eleven, and was included in the soundtrack.

Reception

Bow Down to the Exit Sign received positive reviews from the majority of critics. AllMusic's John Bush saw it as a "vast improvement" over Holmes' previous studio record, Let's Get Killed, concluding, "while his previous work came off as soundtrack material in desperate search of a film to accompany it, Bow Down to the Exit Sign is very much a fully formed record."

Track listing

References

2000 albums
David Holmes (musician) albums